Lyne is a small village and civil parish in the Scottish Borders area of Scotland,  west of the market town of Peebles; it lies off the A72, in the old county of Peeblesshire and has an area of about .

The Lyne Water flows through the village on its journey from the Pentland Hills to the River Tweed.

Lyne railway station was, along with Stobo railway station, one of the nine intermediate stations of the Symington, Biggar and Broughton Railway branch line. See also: Lyne Viaduct.

Dawyck Botanic Garden and Dawyck House are nearby.

This union was dissolved after 270 years in 1891.

See also
Lyne Kirk
Lyne railway station
Lyne Water
Lyne Viaduct
Hallyne
List of places in the Scottish Borders
List of places in East Lothian
List of places in Midlothian
List of places in West Lothian

References

External links

Biggar Archaeology Group / Lyne Heritage Trail
Photos of Lyne Railway station
Peebles Archaeological Society website
Roman fort, fortlet and camps at Hallyne, Lyne
RCAHMS: Border Union Railway, river Lyne Bridge to Harker Section
RCAHMS record for Lyne station

Villages in the Scottish Borders
Peeblesshire
Parishes in Peeblesshire